El Alamo is a rancho (hamlet) in the Mexican state of Sinaloa, in Culiacán Municipality. According to estimates from 2014, 229 inhabitants lived in the settlement.

References 

Populated places in Sinaloa